After the Rain is an Iranian television series produced for IRIB TV3 created by Saeed Soltani. This film is about a story in Reza Shah era.

Plot
After the Rain’ narrates the story of serfdom during a time in Iran’s history. A couple is killed in an accident, but their children believe that foul play was involved. They try to find out more about their family and discover the reason for their parents’ death by reviewing the diary of their grandmother, Shahrbanou.
One of the Guilan governors wife is unable to make a child, so decided to choose a second wife for his husband ...

Cast
Mahmoud Pak Niat
Katayoun Riahi
Marjan Mohtasham
Shahab Hosseini
Jahangir Almasi
Behzad Farahani
Soraya Ghasemi
Saba Kamali
Jamileh Sheykhi
Rahim Norouzi
Kiumars Malek
Ramin Parchami

References

2000s Iranian television series
2000 Iranian television series debuts
Iranian drama television series
Islamic Republic of Iran Broadcasting original programming
Persian-language television shows